Seven Lakes may refer to any of the following:

Locations
Seven Lakes, Colorado, for the former area in El Paso County, Colorado
Seven Lakes, Jackson County, Colorado in Mount Zirkel Wilderness
Seven Lakes, North Carolina, district in United States
Sete Lagoas, city in Minas Gerais, Brazil
Yedigöller National Park in Bolu province, Turkey
Seven Rila Lakes area, Bulgaria
Seven Lakes of San Pablo, Laguna Province, Philippines
Seven Lakes State Park in Holly, Michigan

Others
Road of the Seven Lakes, Argentine Patagonia
Seven Lakes, Chile, a chain of seven lakes in southern Chile
Seven Lakes Drive, New York state, United States
Seven Lakes High School, Fort Bend County, Texas, United States